Howard H. Rainey (August 21, 1927 – May 11, 2021) was an American politician. He served as a Democratic member of the Georgia House of Representatives.

Life and career 
Rainey was born in Crisp County, Georgia. He attended Cordele High School and Georgia Southwestern State University.

In 1961, Rainey was elected to the Georgia House of Representatives. He resigned in 1989 and was succeeded by Johnny Wilson Floyd.

Rainey died in May 2021, at the age of 93.

References 

1927 births
2021 deaths
People from Crisp County, Georgia
Democratic Party members of the Georgia House of Representatives
20th-century American politicians
Georgia Southwestern State University alumni